Halofolliculina is a genus of ciliates belonging to the family Folliculinidae.

Species:
Halofolliculina annulata 
Halofolliculina corallasia
Halofolliculina elegans

References

Heterotrichea
Ciliate genera